The 1976–77 Yugoslav Cup was the 29th season of the top football knockout competition in SFR Yugoslavia, the Yugoslav Cup (Croatian: Kup Jugoslavije, Macedonian: Куп на Југославија, Serbian: Куп Југославије, Slovenian: Pokal Jugoslavije), also known as the "Marshal Tito Cup" (Kup Maršala Tita), since its establishment in 1946.

Calendar
The Yugoslav Cup was a tournament for which clubs from all tiers of the football pyramid were eligible to enter. In addition, amateur teams put together by individual Yugoslav People's Army garrisons and various factories and industrial plants were also encouraged to enter, which meant that each cup edition could have several thousands of teams in its preliminary stages. These teams would play through a number of qualifying rounds before reaching the first round proper, in which they would be paired with top-flight teams.

The tournament proper was held from September to May, with the final played on 24 May, traditionally scheduled to coincide with the end of the football league season and Youth Day celebrated on 25 May (a national holiday in Yugoslavia which also doubled as the official commemoration of Josip Broz Tito's birthday).

Since the cup winner was always meant to be decided on or around the national holiday at the JNA Stadium in capital Belgrade, and to avoid unfair home advantage this would give to Belgrade-based clubs, the Football Association of Yugoslavia adopted the rule in the late 1960s according to which the final could be played as a one-legged tie (in cases when both finalists are from outside Belgrade) or double-legged (when at least one of them is based in the capital), with the second leg always played in Belgrade. This rule was used for all cup finals from 1969 to 1988, when a single-legged final was adopted permanently.

First round
In the following tables winning teams are marked in bold; teams from outside top level are marked in italic script.

Second round

Quarter-finals

Semi-finals

Final

See also
1976–77 Yugoslav First League
1976–77 Yugoslav Second League

External links
1976–77 cup season details at Rec.Sport.Soccer Statistics Foundation
1977 cup final details at Rec.Sport.Soccer Statistics Foundation

Yugoslav Cup seasons
Cup
Yugo